Juan Andrés Silva Cárdenas (born 11 March 1989) is a Chilean footballer. 

He played for Deportes La Serena.

Club career
In 2006, he made his debut with Wanderers in a match against Colo Colo. In the Torneo Clausura 2006 he played 16 games. He did not score but gained experience. In early 2007, he played in the Torneo Clausura again, scoring against rivals Everton and La Serena.

Because of his poor discipline, in November 2008 he was loaned. In early 2009 he was training with staff of San Luis Quillota. but the transfer failed. After twenty days he made a test at the Santa Cruz Futebol Clube, club that figured in the Serie C of Brazil. In the second half of 2009 he started training in Deportes La Serena facilities. Later on, Silva went back and forth through clubs including Cobresal, Ñublense, Cobresal and Rangers without achieving continuity and lasting in each club nearly a year.

As of 2013 he played at Club de Deportes La Serena as midfielder, but several new incidents involving alcohol and fights and arguments with fans, including some explicit offensive gestures during a game on 14 December 2013 vs Deportes Temuco.

Honours

Player
Cobreloa
 Primera División de Chile (1): Runner-up 2011 Clausura

References

1989 births
Living people
Chilean footballers
Cobresal footballers
Ñublense footballers
Deportes La Serena footballers
Santiago Wanderers footballers
Association football midfielders
People from Quillota